"Come into My Life" is a song recorded in 1988 as a duet between singers Laura Branigan and Joe Esposito. It was featured on the soundtrack to the film Coming to America and released in the United States as the second single after the title-track by The System. The 7" single included a previously unreleased song by Branigan entitled "Believe in Me" as the b-side.

Track listings

References

1988 singles
Laura Branigan songs
Joe Esposito (singer) songs
Pop ballads
Atco Records singles
1988 songs